Famous Love Affairs is a 1961 French-Italian anthology film  starring Alain Delon, Brigitte Bardot and Jean Paul Belmondo.

Cast

Lauzun
 Jean-Paul Belmondo as Lauzun 
 Dany Robin as Madame de Monaco 
 Philippe Noiret as King Louis XIV
 Michel Galabru as Champagne, le domestique du roi
 Guy Tréjean as Le gouverneur
 Agnès Laurent as Irène, la femme du gouverneur
 Pierre Palau as Saint-Simon
 Liliane Brousse as Madame de Montespan
 Zanie Campan as Marton 
 France Anglade as Lisette

Jenny de Lacour
 Simone Signoret as Jenny de Lacour
 Pierre Vaneck as René de La Roche
 Antoine Bourseiller Gaudry, le parfumeur boiteux
 François Maistre Le commissaire Massot
 Charles Bouillaud as Un inspecteur
 Lucien Nat as Le préfet
 Colette Castel as Louise

Agnès Bernauer
 Brigitte Bardot as Agnes Bernauer
 Alain Delon as Albert III, Duke of Bavaria
 Suzanne Flon Ursula, La Margravine
 Jean-Claude Brialy Eric Torring
 Jacques Dumesnil as Hans, le bourreau
 Pierre Brasseur as Le grand duc Ernest
 Michel Etcheverry as Gaspard Bernauer, barbier, le père d'Agnès
 Hubert Noël as Eric
 Pierre Massimi as Otto
 Henri Coutet as L'homme rasé
 Maurice Chevit as Un chevalier envoyé du Gurthenberg
 Paul Amiot as L'autre chevalier envoyé du Gurthengerg
 Jacques Monod as Preissing
 Constantin Andrieux as Karl
 Bernard Musson as Un inquisiteur

Les comédiennes
 Edwige Feuillère as Madame Raucourt
 Annie Girardot as Madame Duchesnois
 Jean Desailly as Baron Adrien de Jonchère
 Pierre Dux as Talma
 Marie Laforêt as Madame Georges
 Daniel Ceccaldi as Antonio Villa
 Jean Ozenne as Le marquis Stanislas
 Héléna Manson as the duchess
 Hélène Duc as Une marquise
 Robert Lombard as Un admirateur de Madame Raucourt

Release
The film had its premiere on 31 October 1961 at the Paris Theater in New York City.

References

External links

Famous Love Affairs at Le Film Guide

1961 films
1960s historical films
French historical films
French anthology films
Films directed by Michel Boisrond
Films with screenplays by Michel Audiard
French romantic comedy films
Films about Louis XIV
Films set in the 1660s
Films set in the 1880s
Films set in the 1430s
Films set in the 1800s
Films based on comic strips
Films based on French comics
Live-action films based on comics
1960s French films